Joos van Ghistele (ca. 1446 in Ghentca. 1525) was a Flemish nobleman who spent four years (1481–1485) travelling around in the Middle East and southern Europe, including Italy, Greece, the Balkans, Tunisia, the Levant, Egypt and the Red Sea all the way down to Aden.

His accounts were edited by Ambrosius Zeebout, priest, and posthumously published in 1557 as Tvoyage van Mher Joos van Ghistele, with many later republications. Three editions in Ghent alone (1557, 1563, 1572) in fifteen years show that the book attained considerable popularity in Flanders.

Further reading
Tvoyage van Mher Joos van Ghistele

See also
John Mandeville
Marco Polo

References

1440s births
1520s deaths
15th-century explorers
People of the Burgundian Netherlands
Nobility from Ghent
Burgundian Netherlands writers
Nobility of the Burgundian Netherlands
Explorers of Africa
Explorers of Asia